Bert Avery (5 October 1907 – 6 January 1981) was an Australian rules footballer who played for the South Melbourne Football Club and Melbourne Football Club in the Victorian Football League (VFL).

Notes

External links 

1907 births
Australian rules footballers from Victoria (Australia)
Sydney Swans players
Melbourne Football Club players
1981 deaths